Ustilago tritici is a plant pathogen infecting barley; rye and wheat.

References

External links

Fungal plant pathogens and diseases
Barley diseases
Rye diseases
Wheat diseases
Ustilaginomycotina